Godsend is a 2004 psychological horror thriller film starring Greg Kinnear, Rebecca Romijn, and Robert De Niro, and directed by Nick Hamm from a screenplay by Mark Bomback. It follows a couple (Kinnear and Romijn) who are approached by an enigmatic doctor (De Niro) who offers to clone their deceased son. It received generally negative reviews from critics.

Plot
Paul and Jessie Duncan are a happily married couple who have an eight-year-old son named Adam. The day after his eighth birthday, when fetching a basketball into the street, Adam is killed in a collision. While leaving a church, Jessie and Paul are confronted by Dr. Richard Wells, an old professor of Jessie's. He offers to clone Adam, an illegal procedure which would require a change of location and identity, to which the Duncans reluctantly agree. Everything appears to be fine with the new Adam until he reaches his eighth birthday. That night, he experiences a violent nightmare. Richard explains to Paul that it is typical for boys his age to have night terrors, and that it is not serious. He explains that because Adam II has reached the age at which the original Adam died, his life cannot be predicted anymore. From that moment on, Adam II continues to have night terrors until they become visions and he starts having them while he is wide awake, losing control of his actions.

Adam's visions are recurrent: he witnesses a boy named Zachary walking around in a school building while being laughed at by other children. These images alternate with images of the school burning, and children screaming, and the image of an unidentified woman being attacked and killed with a hammer. Adam's visions affect his daytime personality, making him bitter, delinquent, and uncooperative. Adam begins to bully another boy that goes to his school. One night at dinner, Jessie receives a telephone call from the parent of that child, distressed that her child is missing. Jessie tells Paul, who then asks what Adam was doing that day. Adam says that he was at the river playing. When Paul asks who he was playing with, Adam responds that he is "not supposed to say". The next day, as the Duncans are driving on their way home over a bridge, they are slowed by a police officer. They walk to the side of the bridge to see the woman who had telephoned about her missing child the previous night, screaming at the sight of her son being retrieved by paramedics from a river where he had drowned. Paul believes Adam was involved with the child's death.

With the help of Richard, Paul examines Adam and talks to him about his visions. He finally finds out that the school in Adam's visions is called Saint Pius and that Zachary's last name is Clark. With this information, Paul is able to track down the child's address and find a former nanny of Zachary. The nanny informs Paul that Zachary was deeply disturbed. He was bullied at school tremendously, and in the wake of his emotions, set fire to the school. When he returned home Zachary killed his mother with a hammer before setting fire to their house, where he burned along with his mother’s body.  When he asks the nanny, Paul learns that Zachary's father was a geneticist—enough information to uncover that this man was none other than Richard Wells, living now under a false identity. Through the operation to clone Adam, Richard had secretly mixed Adam's DNA with that of Zachary (as the fire damaged Zachary's DNA to where it could not be cloned without the assistance of other living cells) with the hope of bringing his own son back to life, and then kidnapping him. The operation did not yield a complete success. After arguing with Richard and learning what has caused Adam's erratic behavior, Paul races home. He finds Adam and Jessie in the shed in the woods. He has arrived just in time to stop Adam (with Zachary's personality in control) from killing Jessie with a hammer, in nearly the same way as Zachary had killed his mother. Adam's personality manages to regain control, and everything seems to be okay.

In an attempt to shake the psychological transitions from Adam to Zachary, the Duncans escape from Richard and move to a different neighborhood. All seems well. Adam is friendly and happy, but as he is left alone in his room, Adam hears a noise in the closet. When he opens the closet door, a slightly burnt and decayed arm wearing Zachary’s jersey, reaches out from the darkness of the closet and pulls Adam in. Paul comes back to check on Adam and looks in the closet, but he does not see anyone. Adam then appears from behind and shocks Paul by touching him, indicating that Zachary has regained control.

Cast
Greg Kinnear as Paul Duncan
Rebecca Romijn as Jessie Duncan
Robert De Niro as Richard Wells
Cameron Bright as Adam Duncan
Janet Bailey as Cora Williams
Christopher Britton as Dr. Lieber
Jake Simons as Dan Sandler
Elle Downs as Clara Sandler
Zoie Palmer as Susan Pierce
Devon Bostick as Zachary Clark Wells
Munro Chambers as Max Shaw

Production
The filmmakers included a scene from the 1977 Robert Wise film, Audrey Rose, a film with a similar plot. This scene was included in one of the night terrors.

Marketing

As a part of the film's promotional campaign, Lions Gate set up a website for the fictional Godsend Institute in the film, which claimed to be able to resurrect the dead. Lions Gate changed the website to inform people that it was only an advertisement, due to the large number of inquiries asking if they really resurrect dead family members.

Reception

Critical response
 
The film was poorly received by critics, receiving only 4% based on 138 reviews on Rotten Tomatoes, and is noted for implausible plot devices.

Metacritic gave the film 24% based on 32 reviews by select critics, judging that it has received generally unfavorable reviews.

Roger Ebert awarded the film two out of four stars.  Leonard Maltin awarded the film two and a half stars.

Box office
The film made just under $6,800,617 in its opening weekend, ranking at #4. It went on to earn $14,379,751 domestically and $30,114,487 worldwide, against a budget of $25 million.

References

External links

Website for the fictional Godsend institute

2004 horror films
2004 psychological thriller films
2000s science fiction horror films
American science fiction horror films
American thriller films
Canadian psychological thriller films
Canadian science fiction horror films
English-language Canadian films
Films about cloning
Films directed by Nick Hamm
Films scored by Brian Tyler
Films with screenplays by Mark Bomback
Lionsgate films
2000s English-language films
2000s American films
2000s Canadian films